Hamidou Diallo (born July 31, 1998) is an American professional basketball player for the Detroit Pistons of the National Basketball Association (NBA). He played college basketball for the Kentucky Wildcats. He was a consensus 5-star prospect, and one of the top rated basketball players in the class of 2017. He won the 2019 Slam Dunk Contest.

High school career
Diallo attended John Bowne High School in Flushing, New York during his freshman and sophomore year.  He also attended Putnam Science Academy.  As a sophomore, he averaged 17.1 points, 6.6 rebounds per game, and 2.7 assists. During the 2015 summer, Diallo competed on the Under Armour Association Circuit (UAA) for the AAU team, New York Jayhawks, where he averaged 22.5 points and 5.0 rebounds per game. Later that summer Diallo was invited to both NBPA Top 100 and Adidas Nations camps.

Diallo transferred to Putnam Science Academy in Putnam, Connecticut prior to his Junior Year. As a junior, he averaged 17.0 Points per game, and 4.0 rebounds while leading Putnam to a (35–7) overall record. In the 2016 summer, Diallo then joined the AAU team, New York Rens on the Nike Elite Youth Basketball League (EYBL) Circuit. He averaged 18.6 points, and 2.1 assists while leading the Rens to the season-ending Peach Jam. As a senior in 2016–17, he averaged 19.0 points, 6.0 rebounds, and 3.0 assists where he led the Mustangs to a (38–3) record. 
Diallo was considered one of the top players in the 2017 recruiting class by Scout.com, Rivals.com and ESPN. Diallo was heavily recruited by six schools, the University of Kentucky, The University of Arizona, Indiana University, The University of Kansas, Syracuse University, and the University of Connecticut.

College career
On January 7, 2017, Diallo committed to the University of Kentucky. He reclassified, graduating a semester early and joining the Wildcats midseason that month. He would start participating with the team in practices, but would not play a single game that year due to his late entry into the program. Diallo was one of a record-high 182 players to declare for the 2017 NBA Draft, despite not having played a single college game in the process.

On May 24, 2017, Diallo announced that he would return to Kentucky to play in their 2017–2018 season, despite draft scouts saying he could have been taken in the first round of the draft that year.

Diallo had season averages of 10.0 points per game, and 3.6 rebounds per game.

Professional career

Oklahoma City Thunder (2018–2021)
On June 21, 2018, Diallo was selected with the 45th pick in the 2018 NBA draft by the Brooklyn Nets. His draft rights were subsequently traded to the Charlotte Hornets, and then to the Oklahoma City Thunder. On July 28, 2018, the Oklahoma City Thunder announced that they had signed Diallo to his rookie scale contract. On October 16, 2018, Diallo made his debut in NBA, coming off the bench in a 100–108 loss to the Golden State Warriors with four points, a rebound, an assist and a steal. On November 19, 2018, Diallo scored his career high 18 points with two steals, a rebound, and an assist in a 113–117 loss to the Sacramento Kings.

On February 16, 2019, Diallo won the NBA Slam Dunk Contest, becoming the first Oklahoma City Thunder player ever to win it. For one dunk he jumped over Shaquille O'Neal, and did the "honey dip" dunk popularized by Vince Carter, and displayed a Superman undershirt while hanging from the rim. In another dunk, he jumped over Quavo who held the ball above his head and finished it with two hands.

Detroit Pistons (2021–present)
On March 13, 2021, Diallo was traded to the Detroit Pistons in exchange for Sviatoslav Mykhailiuk and a future second-round draft pick.

On August 19, 2021, Diallo signed a 2-year, $10.4 million rookie scale extension with the Pistons. On March 25, 2022, he was ruled out for the remainder of the 2021–22 season with an avulsion fracture in his left index finger.

On December 29, 2022, Diallo was suspended by the NBA for one game without pay due to an altercation during a game against the Orlando Magic the day before. On March 6, 2023, during a 110–104 loss to the Portland Trail Blazers, he suffered a right ankle injury. The next day, the Pistons announced that Diallo had suffered a Grade 2 sprain in his right ankle and would be re-evaluated in three-to-four weeks. In a press conference the same day, however, Pistons head coach Dwane Casey stated that Diallo would miss the rest of the 2022–23 season.

National team career
Diallo competed for the under-18 United States national basketball team that captured gold in the  FIBA Americas Under-18 Championship game in 2016. He won bronze at the 2017 FIBA Under-19 Basketball World Cup in Egypt.

Career statistics

NBA

Regular season

|-
| style="text-align:left;"|
| style="text-align:left;"|Oklahoma City
| 51 || 3 || 10.3 || .455 || .167 || .610 || 1.9 || .3 || .4 || .2 || 3.7
|-
| style="text-align:left;"|
| style="text-align:left;"|Oklahoma City
| 46 || 3 || 19.5 || .446 || .281 || .603 || 3.6 || .8 || .8 || .2 || 6.9
|-
| style="text-align:left;" rowspan=2|
| style="text-align:left;"|Oklahoma City
| 32 || 5 || 23.8 || .481 || .293 || .629 || 5.2 || 2.4 || 1.0 || .4 || 11.9
|-
| style="text-align:left;"| Detroit
| 20 || 4 || 23.3 || .468 || .390 || .662 || 5.4 || 1.2 || .5 || .6 || 11.2
|-
| style="text-align:left;"|
| style="text-align:left;"|Detroit
| 58 || 29 || 21.9 || .496 || .247 || .650 || 4.8 || 1.3 || 1.2 || .3 || 11.0
|-
| style="text-align:left;"|
| style="text-align:left;"|Detroit
| 56 || 0 || 17.8 || .573 || .238 || .588 || 3.5 || 1.0 || .9 || .3 || 9.3
|- class="sortbottom"
| style="text-align:center;" colspan="2"|Career
| 263 || 44 || 18.7 || .495 || .274 || .623 || 3.8 || 1.1 || .8 || .3 || 8.6

Playoffs

|-
| style="text-align:left;"|2020
| style="text-align:left;"|Oklahoma City
| 3 || 0 || 8.3 || .364 || .200 || .571 || 2.0 || .3 || .0 || .7 || 4.3
|- class="sortbottom"
| style="text-align:center;" colspan="2"|Career
| 3 || 0 || 8.3 || .364 || .200 || .571 || 2.0 || .3 || .0 || .7 || 4.3

College

|-
| style="text-align:left;"|2017–18
| style="text-align:left;"|Kentucky
| 37 || 37 || 24.8 || .428 || .338 || .616 || 3.6 || 1.2 || .8 || .4 || 10.0

Personal life
Diallo grew up in Lefrak City, Queens, New York. He attended JHS 157 Stephen A. Halsey. He is of Guinean descent; his parents, Abdoulaye and Mariama, emigrated to New York from Guinea.

References

External links
Kentucky Wildcats bio
USA Basketball bio

1998 births
Living people
African-American basketball players
American men's basketball players
American people of Guinean descent
Sportspeople of Guinean descent
Basketball players from New York City
Brooklyn Nets draft picks
Detroit Pistons players
Kentucky Wildcats men's basketball players
Oklahoma City Blue players
Oklahoma City Thunder players
Wisconsin Herd players
People from Corona, Queens
Shooting guards
Sportspeople from Queens, New York
21st-century African-American sportspeople